Parachute journalism is the practice of placing journalists into an area to report on a story in which the reporter has little knowledge or experience. The lack of knowledge and tight deadlines often result in inaccurate or distorted news reports, especially during breaking news. As opposed to expert foreign correspondents who might live in the locale, news organizations will sometimes send (metaphorically by "parachute") either general assignment reporters or well-known celebrity journalists into unfamiliar areas.

The term is often used by critics, who argue that this type of journalism usually reports mere basic details and often misrepresents facts, while displaying ignorance of contextual issues. The journalist often lacks in-depth knowledge of the situation and usually is disoriented because of the strangeness of the environment. Often the only information immediately available is from other news organizations or from "official" or bureaucratic sources that may contain propaganda.

Journalists 'parachuted' into a strange situation often lack proper contacts. They may rely on stringers for their sources, and this can lead to strained relationships between the 'parachuter' and the stringer as the newly arrived journalist will receive most of the credit and in the process the quality of reporting can be affected.

Due to a lack of time and knowledge, background research and independent investigation of the events at the site of occurrence can be non-existent, with most research, if any, being done in the journalist's home country before they set off for the point of action. Another drawback is the tendency of parachuters to engage in pack journalism.

One potential advantage of this type of journalism is that the parachuter is an outsider who may be able to look at the news event from a fresh perspective and notice things or provide an angle to the story that a stringer could have missed. He or she might be more likely to be able to pinpoint what a global audience will be interested in.

References

External links
 We're Missing the Story – Anjan Sundaram

Journalism